Giambologna is a crater on Mercury. Its name was adopted by the International Astronomical Union (IAU) on December 16, 2013. Giambologna is named for the Flemish sculptor Jean Boulogne Giambologna.

Giambologna has an unusual, asymmetrical morphology in the east-west direction.  The western side has several broad terraces and no significant flat floor, while the eastern side has a steep cliff at the rim dropping to a flat floor.  The central peak is arcuate in shape.

Giambologna lies on the western side of a much larger, unnamed crater of approximately  diameter.  To the north is the crater Surikov, and to the west is Delacroix.

References

Impact craters on Mercury